Dmitri Viktorovich Kuznetsov (born 28 August 1965) is an association football coach and a former player.

During his club career he played for CSKA Moscow, RCD Espanyol, UE Lleida, Deportivo Alavés and CA Osasuna. He earned 28 caps and scored 2 goals for USSR, CIS and Russia from 1990 to 1994, and played in the 1992 UEFA European Football Championship and the 1994 FIFA World Cup. In 2009, he was part of the Russia squad that won the 2009 Legends Cup.

He played 2 games in the European Cup Winners' Cup 1991–92 for PFC CSKA Moscow.

Honours
 Soviet Top League champion: 1991.
 Soviet Top League runner-up: 1990.
 Soviet Cup winner: 1991.
 Russian Premier League runner-up: 1998.

External links
Profile at RussiaTeam 

1965 births
Living people
Soviet footballers
Association football midfielders
Association football defenders
Soviet Union international footballers
Russian footballers
Russia international footballers
Footballers from Moscow
Russian expatriate footballers
Expatriate footballers in Spain
UEFA Euro 1992 players
1994 FIFA World Cup players
PFC CSKA Moscow players
La Liga players
RCD Espanyol footballers
UE Lleida players
Deportivo Alavés players
CA Osasuna players
FC Lokomotiv Nizhny Novgorod players
FC Moscow players
FC Sokol Saratov players
Soviet Top League players
Russian Premier League players
Dual internationalists (football)
Russian football managers
FC Volgar Astrakhan players
FC Nizhny Novgorod managers
FC Arsenal Tula players
FC FShM Torpedo Moscow players
Russian expatriate football managers